Utu-hengal, also written Utu-heg̃al, Utu-heĝal, and sometimes transcribed as Utu-hegal, Utu-hejal, Utu-Khengal, was one of the first native kings of Sumer after two hundred years of Akkadian and Gutian rule, and was at the origin of the foundation of the Third Dynasty of Ur by his son-in-law Ur-Nammu. He was officially "King of Uruk" in his inscriptions, and is therefore considered as the founder, and only member, of the "Fifth dynasty of Uruk" (Uruk V).

Life and reign 
There are several theories regarding his background. The most common is that he was a governor of Uruk who revolted against the Gutian kings in c. 2050 BC. He led the cities of Sumer against the last Gutian king Tirigan. After a battle at an unknown location, Utu-Hengal was victorious and forced Tirigan to flee back towards Gutium. Tirigan fled to the city of Dubrum (location unknown) where the people treated him kindly. However, once the people of Dubrum heard that Utu-Hengal was marching towards the city, they took Tirigan and his family prisoner. He was brought before Utu-Hengal, and agreed to leave Sumer and retreat back to Gutium. 

After defeating the Gutians, Utu-hengal established himself as the king of Sumer. In the seventh year of the kingship he tragically died in an accident when inspecting a dam (leading some to suspect foul play), and was succeeded by his son-in-law, the governor of Ur, Ur-Nammu, as the king of Sumer. He was thus the only king of the fifth dynasty of Uruk. In fact Sumerian people have always treated Utu-hengal's kingship and the Ur III dynasty together as a single continuous dynasty, with Utu-hengal as the founder. Utu-hengal has been praised as one of the greatest historical figures and heroes of Sumerian people.

Titulature
In his Victory Stele, Utu-hengal describes himself as:

Inscriptions
Utu-hengal is known through numerous inscriptions.

Victory stele

A victory stele was erected in Uruk by Utu-Hengal, a copy of which was made during the Dynasty of Isin, now in the Louvre Museum (AO 6018). The stele described the victory of Utu-Hengal over the Gutians, particularly their king Tirigan. The beginning of the inscription reads:

Copper-alloy vase

A copper-alloy vase, now in the British Museum (BM 1999,0731.1), has an inscription by Utu-hengal:

Stone fragment
Another fragmentary inscription of Utu-hengal, also in the British Museum, only mentions his name and titulature: "Utu-hengal, the great man, King of Uruk, King of the four quarters of the world".

References 

|-

22nd-century BC Sumerian kings
21st-century BC Sumerian kings
Sumerian kings
Kings of Uruk
Accidental deaths in Iraq
Ancient rebels